Sufiyan Alam (born 2 April 1995) is an Indian cricketer who plays for Services. He made his first-class debut on 1 October 2015 in the 2015–16 Ranji Trophy. He made his List A debut in the 2015–16 Vijay Hazare Trophy on 10 December 2015. He made his Twenty20 debut on 8 November 2021, for Services in the 2021–22 Syed Mushtaq Ali Trophy.

References

External links
 

1995 births
Living people
Indian cricketers
Services cricketers
People from New Delhi